Kerala State Industrial Enterprises Limited (KSIE) is the holding company for the state-owned industrial undertakings of the State of Kerala, India. The company was established in 1973.  KSIE have Air Cargo Terminal at Trivandrum International Airport, Air Cargo Terminal at Calicut International Airport, KSIE Business Centres at Thiruvananthapuram, Kochi, Kozhikode, Kottayam and Palakkad. Kerala Soap manufacturing unit Kerala Soaps at Kozhikode. (Kerala Soaps products are now available online through  portal). The e-commerce portal , 'Virtual Office' of Agricultural & Processed Food Products Export Development Authority (APEDA) of the Ministry of Commerce and Industry, Government of India, Cochin International Container Freight Station.

References 

Government-owned companies of Kerala
Government agencies established in 1973
1973 establishments in Kerala
Indian companies established in 1973